The Union School in Filer, Idaho was built in 1914.  It was listed on the National Register of Historic Places in 2003.

In 2002, it was a museum.

An approximately  lava rock wall is all that remains of a taller wall built by the Works Progress Administration, separating the parking area.

References

School buildings completed in 1914
Buildings and structures in Twin Falls County, Idaho
School buildings on the National Register of Historic Places in Idaho
1914 establishments in Idaho
National Register of Historic Places in Twin Falls County, Idaho